The National Botanical Research Institute (NBRI) is a research institute of the Council of Scientific and Industrial Research (CSIR) located in Lucknow, Uttar Pradesh, India. It is engaged in the field of taxonomy and modern biology.

History
Originally conceptualised and set up as the National Botanic Gardens (NBG) by Professor Kailas Nath Kaul on behalf of the State Government of Uttar Pradesh, it was taken over by the CSIR in 1953. Dr Triloki Nath Khoshoo joined in 1964 as the Assistant Director, shortly afterwards becoming the Director. Initially engaged in research work in the classical botanical disciplines, the NBG went on laying an increasing emphasis in keeping with the national needs and priorities in the field of plant sciences, on its applied and developmental research activities. Due to the untiring efforts of Dr Khoshoo, the institute rose to the stature of being the National Botanical Research Institute in 1978, reflecting the correct nature and extent of its aims and objectives, functions and R & D activities. Sikandar Bagh is a famous and historic pleasure garden, located in the grounds of the Institute.

Achievements
 NBRI developed a new variety of bougainvillea, named Los Banos Variegata-Jayanthi.
In a move to fight against whiteflies National Botanical Research Institute (NBRI) Lucknow has developed a pest resistant variety of cotton.
A group of innovators developed first indigenous transgenic cotton variety expressing bt protein.

South Africa
National Botanical Research Institute (NBRI) is also the state botanical research institute of South Africa.

References

Council of Scientific and Industrial Research
Plant taxonomy
Botanical research institutes
Research institutes in Lucknow
Tourist attractions in Lucknow
Year of establishment missing
1953 establishments in Uttar Pradesh
Research institutes established in 1953